Clube Ferroviário de Luanda is an Angolan multisports club based in Luanda. The club owns its name to its major sponsor, the Luanda Railway Company.

In 1953 the team has won the Campeonato Estadual da I Divisão (Angola's top division before independence).

Stadium
Currently the team plays at the 12000 capacity Estádio dos Coqueiros.

Honours
Girabola: 1953, 1957, 1962

See also
 Ferroviário de Luanda Handball
 Ferroviário de Luanda Basketball
 Girabola
 2014 Girabola

References

External links
http://blogdangola.blogspot.it/2007/12/clube-ferrovirio-de-luanda.html
http://www.calciozz.it/equipa.php?id=64372

Football clubs in Angola
Railway association football teams